This is a list of airports that Continental Express flew to at the time of its merger into United Express.

North America

Canada
Halifax - Halifax International Airport
Moncton - Moncton International Airport
Mont-Tremblant - La Macaza – Mont Tremblant International Airport seasonal
Montreal - Montréal-Pierre Elliott Trudeau International Airport
Ottawa - Ottawa Macdonald–Cartier International Airport
Quebec City - Québec/Jean Lesage International Airport
St. John's - St. John's International Airport
Toronto - Toronto Pearson International Airport

Mexico
Acapulco - General Juan N. Álvarez International Airport
Aguascalientes - Lic. Jesús Terán Peredo International Airport
Chihuahua - Roberto Fierro Villalobos International Airport
Ciudad del Carmen - Ciudad del Carmen International Airport
Durango - General Guadalupe Victoria International Airport
Guadalajara - Don Miguel Hidalgo y Costilla International Airport
Huatulco - Bahías de Huatulco International Airport
Ixtapa-Zihuatanejo - Ixtapa-Zihuatanejo International Airport
León - Del Bajío International Airport
Manzanillo - Playa de Oro International Airport
Mazatlán - General Rafael Buelna International Airport
Mexico City - Mexico City International Airport
Monterrey - General Mariano Escobedo International Airport
Morelia - General Francisco J. Mujica International Airport
Oaxaca - Xoxocotlán International Airport
Puebla - Hermanos Serdán International Airport
Puerto Vallarta - Lic. Gustavo Díaz Ordaz International Airport
Saltillo - Plan de Guadalupe International Airport
San José del Cabo - Los Cabos International Airport
San Luis Potosí - Ponciano Arriaga International Airport
Querétaro - Querétaro International Airport
Tampico - General Francisco Javier Mina International Airport
Toluca - Lic. Adolfo López Mateos International Airport
Tuxtla Gutierrez -Angel Albino Corzo International Airport
Torreón - Francisco Sarabia International Airport
Veracruz - General Heriberto Jara International Airport
Villahermosa - Carlos Rovirosa Pérez International Airport

United States
Alabama
Birmingham - Birmingham-Shuttlesworth International Airport
Huntsville - Huntsville International Airport
Mobile - Mobile Regional Airport
Arizona
Phoenix - Sky Harbor International Airport
Tucson - Tucson International Airport
Arkansas
Fayetteville - Northwest Arkansas Regional Airport
Little Rock - Little Rock National Airport
Colorado
Colorado Springs - Colorado Springs Airport
Denver - Denver International Airport
Montrose/Telluride - Montrose Regional Airport
Connecticut
Hartford - Bradley International Airport
Florida
Fort Myers - Southwest Florida International Airport
Fort Walton Beach - Northwest Florida Regional Airport
Jacksonville - Jacksonville International Airport
Miami - Miami International Airport
Orlando - Orlando International Airport
Pensacola - Pensacola Regional Airport
Tampa/St.Petersburg - Tampa International Airport
West Palm Beach - Palm Beach International Airport
Georgia (U.S. state)
Atlanta - Hartsfield-Jackson Atlanta International Airport
Savannah - Savannah International Airport
Illinois
Chicago - O'Hare International Airport
Indiana
Indianapolis - Indianapolis International Airport
Iowa
Des Moines - Des Moines International Airport
Kansas
Wichita - Wichita Mid-Continent Airport
Kentucky
Cincinnati, Ohio area - Cincinnati/Northern Kentucky International Airport Cincinnati is in Ohio, and the airport is in Kentucky
Lexington - Blue Grass Airport
Louisville - Louisville International Airport
Louisiana
Alexandria - Alexandria International Airport
Baton Rouge - Baton Rouge Metropolitan Airport
Lafayette - Lafayette Regional Airport
New Orleans - Louis Armstrong New Orleans International Airport
Monroe - Monroe Regional Airport
Shreveport - Shreveport Regional Airport
Maine
Portland - Portland International Jetport
Maryland
Baltimore - Baltimore/Washington International Airport
Massachusetts
Boston - Logan International Airport
Michigan
Detroit - Detroit Metropolitan Wayne County Airport
Flint - Bishop International Airport
Grand Rapids - Gerald R. Ford International Airport
Minnesota
Minneapolis/St. Paul - Minneapolis-Saint Paul International Airport
Mississippi
Gulfport/Biloxi - Gulfport-Biloxi International Airport
Jacskon - Jackson-Evers International Airport
Missouri
Kansas City - Kansas City International Airport
St. Louis - Lambert-Saint Louis International Airport
Nebraska
Omaha - Eppley Airfield
New Hampshire
Manchester - Manchester-Boston Regional Airport
New Jersey
Newark - Newark Liberty International Airport (hub)
New Mexico
Albuquerque - Albuquerque International Sunport
Hobbs - Lea County Regional Airport
New York
Albany - Albany International Airport
Buffalo - Buffalo Niagara International Airport
New York City - LaGuardia Airport
Rochester - Greater Rochester International Airport
Syracuse - Syracuse Hancock International Airport
North Carolina
Asheville - Asheville Regional Airport
Charlotte - Charlotte/Douglas International Airport
Greensboro - Piedmont Triad International Airport
Raleigh/Durham - Raleigh-Durham International Airport
Ohio for Cincinnati see Kentucky
Cleveland - Hopkins International Airport (hub)
Columbus - Port Columbus International Airport
Dayton - Dayton International Airport
Oklahoma
Oklahoma City - Will Rogers World Airport
Tulsa - Tulsa International Airport
Pennsylvania
Allentown - Lehigh Valley International Airport
Harrisburg - Harrisburg International Airport
Philadelphia - Philadelphia International Airport
Pittsburgh - Pittsburgh International Airport
Rhode Island
Providence - T. F. Green Airport
South Carolina
Charleston - Charleston International Airport
Columbia - Columbia Metropolitan Airport
Greenville/Spartanburg - Greenville-Spartanburg International Airport
Tennessee
Knoxville - McGhee Tyson Airport
Memphis - Memphis International Airport
Nashville - Nashville International Airport
Texas
Amarillo - Rick Husband Amarillo International Airport
Austin - Austin-Bergstrom International Airport
Brownsville - Brownsville/South Padre Island International Airport
Corpus Christi - Corpus Christi International Airport
Dallas/Fort Worth
Dallas/Fort Worth International Airport
Love Field
El Paso - El Paso International Airport
Harlingen - Valley International Airport
Houston - George Bush Intercontinental Airport (Primary Hub)
Killeen - Killeen-Fort Hood Regional Airport
Laredo - Laredo International Airport
Lubbock - Lubbock Preston Smith International Airport
McAllen - McAllen-Miller International Airport
Midland - Midland International Airport
San Antonio - San Antonio International Airport
Utah
Salt Lake City - Salt Lake City International Airport
Vermont
Burlington - Burlington International Airport
Virginia
Norfolk - Norfolk International Airport
Richmond - Richmond International Airport
Washington, D.C. area
Ronald Reagan Washington National Airport
Washington Dulles International Airport
West Virginia
Charleston - Yeager Airport
Wisconsin
Green Bay - Austin Straubel International Airport [resumes May 2]
Madison - Dane County Regional Airport
Milwaukee - General Mitchell International Airport

Atlantic 
Bahamas
Nassau - Lynden Pindling International Airport

Former destinations
North America
United States
Arizona - Tucson
California - Bakersfield, Los Angeles, Palm Springs
Colorado - Durango, Gunnison/Crested Butte, Hayden/Steamboat Springs
Florida - Daytona Beach, Sarasota/Bradenton, Tallahassee
Georgia - Augusta
Idaho - Boise
Indiana - Fort Wayne
Louisiana - Lake Charles (Now Served by Continental Connection)
Maine - Bangor
Massachusetts - Martha's Vineyard, Nantucket
Michigan - Saginaw/Bay Cities
New Jersey - Atlantic City
New Mexico - Albuquerque, Alamogordo, Carlsbad, Farmington, Roswell
New York - Islip/Long Island, White Plains
Pennsylvania - Scranton/Wilkes Barre
South Carolina - Myrtle Beach
Tennessee - Chattanooga
Texas - Houston-Ellington Field, Houston-Hobby, San Angelo-Mathis Field
Beaumont, College Station (Both Now Served by Continental Connection)
Mexico - Hermosillo, Monclova, Zacatecas
Bahamas - Freeport

Central America
Guatemala - Flores/Tikal

References

 
 

Lists of airline destinations